Plympton Guildhall is a Grade II* listed building in Plympton, Devon, England. Standing at 42 Fore Street, Plympton's main street, it dates to 1688. It was built at the joint expense of Sir George Treby (1643–1700) and Richard Strode (1638–1707) of Newnham, Member of Parliament for Plympton Erle.

It is constructed of roughly coursed rubble with dressed granite quoins.

Coat of arms detail

References

Grade II* listed buildings in Devon
Buildings and structures in Plympton, Devon
1688 establishments in England
Plympton